The Prince of Wales Challenge Cup is a rowing event for men's quadruple sculls at the annual Henley Royal Regatta on the River Thames at Henley-on-Thames in England.  It is open to male crews from all eligible rowing clubs and has similar qualifying rules to the Ladies' Challenge Plate. Two or more clubs may combine to make an entry.

The trophy was donated to the regatta in 2007 by Mr. V. G. Saunders and was the prize awarded to the winner of the 1931 King's Cup Aero Race - E. C. T. Edwards, the brother of H. R. A. (Jumbo) Edwards.

Past winners

References

Events at Henley Royal Regatta
Rowing trophies and awards